Charles Frank "Chic" Burlingame III (September 12, 1949 – September 11, 2001) was the Captain of American Airlines Flight 77, the aircraft that was crashed by terrorists into the Pentagon during the September 11 attacks.

Biography
Burlingame was born on September 12, 1949, in St. Paul, Minnesota, to parents Charles F. "Chuck" Burlingame Jr. and Patricia Ann Burlingame (née Meyer). He moved frequently as a son of an active-duty member of the United States Air Force, spending parts of his childhood in California and England. Burlingame graduated from Anaheim High School, California, in 1967. He was active in the Boy Scouts of America, where he achieved its highest rank, Eagle Scout.

Burlingame graduated with a Bachelor of Science degree in Aeronautical Engineering from the United States Naval Academy in 1971.  In the Navy, upon receiving his naval aviator wings, he flew F-4 Phantom jets in Fighter Squadron 103 (VF-103) on board . He was an honor graduate of the United States Navy Fighter Weapons School (TOPGUN) at NAS Miramar, California. In 1979, Burlingame left active duty with the Navy and transferred to the U.S. Navy Reserve, and started to work for American Airlines. He volunteered to be activated during the Gulf War. He also spent time working in The Pentagon, while in the Naval Reserve.

Burlingame retired from the Navy Reserve as a captain in 1996 and continued to work for American Airlines.

He was married to an American Airlines flight attendant, Sheri Burlingame. They lived in Oak Hill, Virginia.

Death

Burlingame was the Captain of American Airlines Flight 77, with First Officer David Charlebois, before it was hijacked and flown into the Pentagon. Unlike the other three flights, there were no reports of anyone being stabbed or a bomb threat. He might not have been murdered by the hijackers but instead shoved to the back of the plane with the rest of the passengers. Barbara Olson, a passenger on the flight, asked her husband on her mobile phone, "What do I tell the pilot to do?" suggesting that Burlingame was next to her at the back of the aircraft. He would have turned 52 the day after the incident.

Burlingame was buried in the Arlington National Cemetery. He was initially deemed ineligible for burial there because he was a reservist who died before age 60, but Burlingame was given a waiver and his case triggered reform of Arlington's burial criteria. Astronaut Frank Culbertson, Burlingame's friend and classmate at the Naval Academy, who had witnessed and photographed the aftermath of the September 11 attacks from space, played taps on his trumpet at Burlingame's memorial service.

At the National September 11 Memorial, Burlingame is memorialized at the South Pool, on Panel S-69.

Awards and decorations
Burlingame was awarded the Defense Superior Service Medal, the National Defense Service Medal (with one service star), the Navy Sea Service Deployment Ribbon, Navy and Marine Corps Overseas Service Ribbon (with one service star), the Armed Forces Reserve Medal, the Navy Rifle Marksmanship Ribbon, and the Navy Expert Pistol Medal.

See also

Debra Burlingame

References

External links

1949 births
2001 deaths
20th-century American engineers
American Airlines Flight 77
American aerospace engineers
American terrorism victims
Aviators from Minnesota
Aviators killed in aviation accidents or incidents in the United States
Burials at Arlington National Cemetery
Commercial aviators
Contestants on American game shows
Military personnel from Minnesota
People from Fairfax County, Virginia
People from Saint Paul, Minnesota
People murdered in Virginia
Terrorism deaths in Virginia
United States Naval Academy alumni
United States Naval Aviators
United States Navy officers
Victims of the September 11 attacks
American Airlines people
American expatriates in England
Recipients of the Defense Superior Service Medal
United States Navy reservists